Carmen Teresa Meléndez Rivas (born 3 November 1961) is a Venezuelan politician and Navy admiral. She was Minister of Interior and Justice from 25 October 2014 to 9 March 2015, and Chief of Staff in President Nicolás Maduro's cabinet for nearly six months from March to September 2015. After a governorship in Lara (2017–2020), she headed the Interior Ministry for the second time, from October 2020 to August 2021.

Political career
Meléndez was the Deputy Minister of Education of the Ministry of Defense. On July 3, 2012, the president of Venezuela, Hugo Chavez, promoted her to the rank of Vice Admiral. Melendez was the first Venezuelan woman to receive this distinction in after being named Commander of General Staff of the Bolivarian Armed Forces. On 13 October, she was named Minister of People's Power of the Office by President Hugo Chavez and confirmed by national decree on 15 October. On 21 April 2013, during a national radio and television, she was reaffirmed as Minister of Management the Bolivarian Government of Venezuela for the government of Nicolas Maduro. On 3 July 2013 the president of the republic amounts to admiral in chief and July 5, 2013, the appointed Minister of Defense, the first woman to hold both charges in the history of Venezuela.

Sanctions
Meléndez has been sanctioned by several countries and is banned from entering neighboring Colombia. The Colombian government maintains a list of people banned from entering Colombia or subject to expulsion; as of January 2019, the list had 200 people with a "close relationship and support for the Nicolás Maduro regime".

United States 
On 9 August 2017, the United States Department of the Treasury placed sanctions on Meléndez for her position in the 2017 Constituent Assembly of Venezuela where she is tasked with the street government command.

Canada 
Canada sanctioned Meléndez on 22 September 2017 due to alleged "rupture of Venezuela's constitutional order."

Panama 
On 29 March 2018, Meléndez was sanctioned by the Panamanian government for her alleged involvement with "money laundering, financing of terrorism and financing the proliferation of weapons of mass destruction".

References

1961 births
Living people
People from Barinas (state)
United Socialist Party of Venezuela politicians
Venezuelan Ministers of Interior
Women state governors of Venezuela
Venezuelan admirals
Female defence ministers
Female admirals
Governors of Lara (state)
People of the Crisis in Venezuela
Women government ministers of Venezuela
Venezuelan female military personnel
21st-century Venezuelan women politicians
21st-century Venezuelan politicians
Members of the Venezuelan Constituent Assembly of 2017
Secretariat of the Presidency ministers of Venezuela